Elasmias is a genus of tropical tree-living air-breathing land snails, arboreal pulmonate gastropod mollusks in the family Achatinellidae.

Elasmias is the type genus of the tribe Elasmiatini.

Species
Species within the genus Elasmias include:
 Elasmias cernicum
 Elasmias jaurffreti
 Elasmias kitaiwojimanum
 Elasmias quadrasi
 Elasmias wakefieldiae Cox, 1868

References

 
Achatinellidae
Taxonomy articles created by Polbot